Without filter is a 2001 Italian film directed by Mimmo Raimondi starring J-Ax, DJ Jad and Luciano Federico. The film stars the hip hop duo Articolo 31 in their acting debut.

Cast 
 Alessandro Aleotti: Nico
 Vito Perrini: Ray
 Albertino: Duca Conte
 Anna Melato: Nico's mother
 Chiara De Bonis: Betty
 Cochi Ponzoni: Nico's father
 Gino Mosna: Attilio
 Kay Rush: Angie
 Luciano Federico: Manu 
 Paolo Sassanelli: Vanni
 Luca Aleotti: Grido

Soundtrack 
Articolo 31:
Fatti un giro 
Strada di città 2000  
Fino in fondo  
Perché sì!  
Tranqi Funky 
Un'altra cosa che ho perso  
Guapa Loca 
Raptuz rock 
Domani 
Volume 
Con le buone

Gemelli DiVersi:
Ciò che poteva essere 
Funky lobby  
Musica  
Un attimo ancora  
Tunaizdanaiz

Space One:
Latin lover  
Nuda  
Provo per te  
Profumi di strada

Pooglia Tribe:
Senza problemi  
Cime di rap 
Malati

Le iene:
Paura

Xsense:
Poche cose nuove

The Individuals:
I don't wanna be love

Reggae National Tickets:
Cose che succedono

References

External links
 

2001 films
Italian musical comedy-drama films
2000s Italian-language films
Hip hop films
2000s Italian films